Ravelo Municipality is the second municipal section of the Chayanta Province in the Potosí Department in Bolivia. Its seat is Ravelo.

Geography 
Some of the highest mountains of the municipality are listed below:

Subdivision 
The municipality consists of the following cantons: 
 Antora
 Huaycoma
 Pitantora
 Ravelo
 Tomoyo
 Toroca

The people 
The people are predominantly indigenous citizens of Quechua descent.

References

External links 
Ravelo Municipality: population data and map

Municipalities of Potosí Department